"The Father-Thing" is a 1954 science fiction short story by American writer Philip K. Dick. The story, told through third-person narration but focusing on the child, concerns the replacement of a boy's father with a replicated version. At first, only the child sees the difference and has to recruit other children to help him reveal the truth. The story is typical of Dick's short stories of the period.

The premise was widely used in fiction of the time.  Works like Invasion of the Body Snatchers, especially popular in the 1950s, expressed the fear that people are not what they seem to be. Dick's story is typically more personal because it is not about the invasion of a community, but of a family.

The Father-Thing is the US Underwood-Miller (1987) and UK title of the third collected volume of Dick's short stories, retitled Second Variety after "Second Variety" was moved from Volume 2 by Citadel.

Adaptations
In 2017, writer-director Michael Dinner adapted the story as an episode of the TV series Philip K. Dick's Electric Dreams, starring Greg Kinnear as the Father.

See also
 "The New Mother"
 Human disguise
 Capgras delusion
 The Hanging Stranger
 Folie à Deux (The X-Files)

References

External links

1954 short stories
Short stories by Philip K. Dick
Science fiction horror novels
Alien invasions in fiction